Victor Joseph Mignogna; born August 27, 1962) is  an American voice actor and musician known for his voice-over work in the English dubs of Japanese anime shows, such as Edward Elric from the Fullmetal Alchemist series, which earned him the American Anime Award for Best Actor in 2007. Other animation roles include Broly from the Dragon Ball films, Tamaki Suoh in Ouran High School Host Club, Fai D. Flowright in Tsubasa: Reservoir Chronicle, Dark in D.N.Angel, Kurz Weber in the Full Metal Panic! series, Zero and Ichiru Kiryu in the Vampire Knight series, Christopher Aonuma in Digimon Fusion, Nagato and Obito Uchiha in Naruto Shippuden, Ikkaku Madarame in Bleach, Rohan Kishibe in JoJo's Bizarre Adventure: Diamond Is Unbreakable, Qrow Branwen in RWBY, and Matt Ishida in Digimon Adventure tri. In video games, he has voiced E-123 Omega in the Sonic the Hedgehog series and Junpei Iori from Persona 3. In live-action work, he has participated in several Star Trek fan productions, including Star Trek Continues, where he plays Captain James T. Kirk.

Allegations of sexual assault and harassment have been made against Mignogna by fans and professionals in the voice acting industry. Sony Pictures and Rooster Teeth ended their professional relationships with him. Mignogna unsuccessfully pursued legal cases against Funimation and other industry professionals in relation to the allegations and was ordered by a court to pay the defendants' legal fees; Mignogna lost three subsequent appeals.

Early life
Mignogna was born in Greensburg, Pennsylvania, to Barb Myers. He graduated from Liberty University with a degree in television and film production, and taught English and speech at Trinity Christian Academy in Jacksonville, Florida. Mignogna helped produce and arrange some of the songs on DC Talk's eponymous first album. He was a summer seasonal officer with the Ocean City Police Department. In 1990, Mignogna moved to Houston, Texas, where he was a film and video production instructor at The Art Institute of Houston. In 1993, he was a contestant on American television talent show Star Search, on which he sang "Worth Waiting For".

Career

While working in video production with John Gremillion in Houston, Mignogna got involved in voice acting at ADV Films. He made his debut as Vega in the video game-based anime series Street Fighter II V. Mignogna started attending anime conventions, where he contacted Funimation and landed the voice role of Broly in the Dragon Ball Z movies, as well as Dragon Ball Super: Broly.

In 2007, the American Anime Awards presented Mignogna with an award for Best Actor for his work on Fullmetal Alchemist. He often gains attention for his role in Alchemist, and he at one point attended between 15 and 25 conventions per year. One of Mignogna's career goals was "to record at all of the major places where dubbing is done". He said he was "the first ADV voice actor to record at Funimation in Dallas and then I was the first to go to New York". He has also recorded in Los Angeles; he tried out for Bleach and received the part of Ikkaku Madarame. In non-anime productions, he voiced Qrow Branwen in Rooster Teeth's web series RWBY.

In addition to voice acting, Mignogna has been involved in production for music, sound, and video. He has produced hundreds of jingles for commercials, and he was a worship leader with Houston's First Baptist Church. Mignogna has sung the U.S. national anthem at several Houston Astros baseball games. As a musician, he has released several albums, some of which feature English cover versions of anime songs from shows including Funimation dub of One Piece and the Dragon Ball series. He also handled some of the ADR direction for the English dub of Claymore, in which he voices Rigaldo.

Mignogna has been involved with several fan productions, including Fullmetal Fantasy and Star Trek: Phase II. In the latter series, he co-directed the episode "Enemy: Starfleet" and played the Andorian Captain. He directed "KITUMBA" and played Malkthon the Klingon, and was slated to direct the episode "Mindsifter". In 2012, Mignogna worked with the Starship Farragut production group. He directed and starred as Captain James T. Kirk in their web series Star Trek Continues. Mignogna has received good reviews for writing, directing, executive-producing, and starring in Star Trek Continues, especially for his portrayal of the character of Kirk, respectfully using William Shatner's unique mannerisms and cadence.

Sexual harassment allegations

Following the English release of Dragon Ball Super: Broly, which prominently features Mignogna's vocal work, allegations of sexual harassment against him began to surface on Twitter, with some allegations dating back to 1989. Multiple accounts alleged that he kissed, groped, and made lewd comments to fans without their consent, some of whom were underage. Voice actresses Monica Rial and Jamie Marchi tweeted their support for those speaking out, and alleged that he had also sexually harassed them.

On January 22, 2019, Tammi Denbow, executive director of employee relations at Sony Pictures, opened an investigation based on reports made by Rial, two female fans, and a former Funimation employee, which concluded a week later with termination of his contract. On February 5, Rooster Teeth severed their business relationship with him, and Funimation recast his role of the Executive in The Morose Mononokean. Multiple anime conventions also removed him from their guest list. In response to the controversy, Mignogna categorically denied any accusations of sexual harassment.

Mignogna issued a statement of regret during his panel at Bak-Anime 2019 and again via Twitter on February 13, 2019. Fans donated over $262,000 to a crowdfunding account opened by lawyer Nick Rekieta, who assisted Mignogna in acquiring Ty Beard as his attorney. On February 20, Mignogna confirmed on Twitter that he was pursuing legal action, and later filed a million-dollar lawsuit against Funimation, Rial, Marchi, and Ron Toye for defamation and tortious interference in the Tarrant County District Court. Funimation filed a response on June 12, 2019, denying Mignogna's allegations.

On June 26, Mignogna was deposed. On July 1, 2019, Funimation filed an anti-SLAPP motion for Mignogna to dismiss his lawsuit. Rial, Marchi, and Toye then filed anti-SLAPP motions on July 19, with ten affidavits, including ones from Kara Edwards and Michele Specht, as well as several allegations that he had also made unwanted advances towards Mari Iijima. On July 30, another affidavit was submitted by the two fans from Funimation's investigation.

On September 6, 2019, a judge dismissed seven of the twelve claims, ruling in the defendants' favor. Mignogna was required to pay all of Marchi's legal fees. On October 4, 2019, the District Court announced the remaining claims had been dismissed. Mignogna filed an appeal on October 24, with a hearing set for November 21. The judge later ruled that Mignogna was required to pay for the defendants' attorney fees. On August 18, 2022, the Texas Second Court of Appeals affirmed the dismissal of Mignogna's lawsuit and ruled that the District Court judge erred with regards to the lawyer's fees awarded to Rial and Toye, revising the initial amount up from $100,000 to $282,953.80 to account for additional costs. Mignogna's appeal was denied in September 2022. On November 14, 2022, Mignogna filed a petition for review in the Supreme Court of Texas, which was subsequently denied on December 30, 2022.

Personal life 

Mignogna was in a relationship with actress Michele Specht from 2006 to May 2018.

Filmography

Anime

Animation

Films

Video games

Live action

Documentary

Discography

Studio albums
 If These Walls Could Talk (1992)
 Selah – Music for the Quiet Time (2004–2005)
 Metafiction (2006)
 Christmas (2008)
 Selah II (2009)
 Revix (2010) – a remix album of some of his earlier singles

Audio recordings
 Gospel of John
 A Howl at the Moon (2014) – audiobook narrator

Notes

References

External links

 
 
 
 
 

1960s births
Living people
American male video game actors
American male voice actors
Liberty University alumni
Male actors from Houston
Male actors from Los Angeles
Male actors from Philadelphia
Musicians from Houston
People from Greensburg, Pennsylvania
People from Westmoreland County, Pennsylvania
Singers from Los Angeles
Singers from Pennsylvania
Singers from Texas
Songwriters from California
Songwriters from Pennsylvania
Songwriters from Texas
Year of birth uncertain
20th-century American male actors
21st-century American male actors
20th-century American male musicians
21st-century American male musicians
20th-century American singers
21st-century American singers